The 1999–2000 Washington Huskies men's basketball team represented the University of Washington for the 1999–2000 NCAA Division I men's basketball season. Led by seventh-year head coach Bob Bender, the Huskies were members of the Pacific-10 Conference and played their home games this season off campus at KeyArena in Seattle, Washington.

There was no conference tournament this season; last played in 1990, it resumed in 2002.

Built over seventy years earlier in 1927, Hec Edmundson Pavilion underwent a renovation this season and reopened in the fall of 2000. The Huskies' interim home court was KeyArena at Seattle Center, the home of the NBA's Seattle SuperSonics. Washington won just twice at KeyArena in Pac-10 play, a one-point upset of UCLA in early January, and a four-point win over rival Washington State in March; in between, they lost seven consecutive

References

External links
Sports Reference – Washington Huskies: 1999–2000 basketball season

Washington Huskies men's basketball seasons
Washington Huskies
Washington
Washington